Bazpur, or Bajpur, is a city and a municipality in Udham Singh Nagar district in the state of Uttarakhand, India.

Bazpur is well connected with the industrial city of Rudrapur and the historical city of Kashipur. Bazpur is nearest city to Nainital. It is an affluent town, mainly due to large agricultural estates. It was initially, like most of the area which forms present day Udham Singh Nagar District, a part of the Terai, and was gradually transformed into arable land by migrants from Punjab. Most of the early settlers were those rendered homeless by the Partition of India in 1947.

India's first co-operative sugar mill went into production in Bazpur on 16 February 1959.

History
It was established in early in 17th century, by Chand king, Lakshmi Chand (1597–1621), and named after a former Chand king, Baz Bahadur. Later, when Bazpur was fully jungle  area the people of Punjab who were rendering homeless founded this area and the founder was Shri Banta Ram who own more than half of the land of Bazpur legally. He also gave some other people land from free of cost who were rendering homeless in the area in that time. Also some Prominent names of the area like Shubhash Sharma, Namdhari, Deep Chand, Gurbachan Lal Sharma, Devi Swaroop Pathak and there family presently lives here from very long time and have a well known maintained name and personality in the area. Bazpur is the location of the first co-operative sugar mill in India, which was dedicated to the nation by Jawahar Lal Nehru. It was the first effort of establishment of a sugar factory in the co-operative sector, which went into production on 16 February 1959.

Demographics
, Bazpur had a population of 21,782. Males constitute 55% of the population and females 45%. Bazpur has an average literacy rate of 66%, higher than the national average of 59.5%; with 60% of the males and 40% of females literate. 14% of the population is under 6 years of age.

Education
 Universal Academy (Educomp)
 R.K.S.V.M Inter College Bazpur
Sri Dashmesh School
St Mary's School
RiverDale
Inter College Bazpur
Rajkiya Mahavidyalaya
Saraswati Sishu Mandir
Saraswati Vidya Mandir
Delhi public School  
S T M Convent Junior High school
 Saraswati Gyan Mandir Barhaini
 D.A.V Public school

Nearby Places of interest
Jim Corbett National Park
Kashipur
Moradabad
New Delhi
Nainital
Rampur
Haldwani

References

Cities and towns in Udham Singh Nagar district